The 2012 United States House of Representatives elections in California were held on November 6, 2012, with a primary election on June 5, 2012. Voters elected the 53 U.S. representatives from the state, one from each of the state's 53 congressional districts. The elections coincided with the elections of other federal and state offices, including a quadrennial presidential election and a U.S. Senate election.

According to The Cook Political Report and Roll Call, the most competitive districts were the 7th, 10th, 26th, 36th, and 52nd; additionally, the 3rd, 9th, 24th, 41st, and 47th were rated as less than safe. Roll Call additionally listed the 21st district as competitive. Voters in 14 districts elected new representatives: the 1st, 2nd, 7th, 8th, 15th, 21st, 26th, 29th, 35th, 36th, 41st, 47th, 51st, and 52nd. Two districts, the 30th and the 44th, had two incumbents running against each other.

This was the first election using congressional districts drawn by the California Citizens Redistricting Commission. The districts, based on the 2010 United States census, were approved on August 15, 2011. It was also the first non-special election to use the nonpartisan blanket primary system established by Proposition 14. As a result, eight districts featured general elections with two candidates of the same party: the 15th, 30th, 35th, 40th, 43rd, and 44th with two Democrats; and the 8th and 31st with two Republicans.

Overview

Districts

District 1 

The 1st district is based in inland Northern California and includes Chico and Redding. Republican Wally Herger, who represented the 2nd district from 1987 to 2013, retired.

District 2 

The 2nd district is based in California's North Coast and includes Marin County and Eureka. Democrat Lynn Woolsey, who represented the 6th district from 1993 to 2013, retired.

District 3 

The 3rd district is based in north central California and includes Davis, Fairfield, and Yuba City. Democrat John Garamendi, who represented the 10th district from 2009 to 2013, won reelection here.

District 4 

The 4th district is based in east central California and includes Lake Tahoe, Roseville, and Yosemite National Park. Republican Tom McClintock, who has represented the 4th district since 2009, won reelection here.

District 5 

The 5th district is based in the North Bay and includes Napa, Santa Rosa, and Vallejo. Democrat Mike Thompson, who represented the 1st district from 1999 to 2013, won reelection here.

District 6 

The 6th district is based in north central California and includes Sacramento. Democrat Doris Matsui, who represented the 5th district from 2005 to 2013, won reelection here.

District 7 

The 7th district is based in north central California and includes eastern Sacramento County. Republican Dan Lungren, who represented the 3rd district from 2005 to 2013 and previously served from 1979 until 1989, lost reelection here to Democrat Ami Bera. In May 2016, Babulal Bera, Ami Bera's father, pleaded guilty to two felony counts of election fraud affecting the 2010 and 2012 elections, and was convicted of illegally funneling $250,000 to Bera's campaigns between 2010 and 2012.

District 8 

The 8th district is based in the eastern High Desert and includes Victorville and Yucaipa. Republican Jerry Lewis, who represented the 41st district from 2003 to 2013 and its predecessors since 1983, retired.

District 9 

The 9th district is based in the Central Valley and includes the San Joaquin Delta and Stockton. Democrat Jerry McNerney, who represented the 11th district from 2007 to 2013, won reelection here.

District 10 

The 10th district is based in the Central Valley and includes Modesto and Tracy. Democrat Dennis Cardoza, who represented the 18th district from 2003 to 2013, retired. Republican Jeff Denham, who represented the 19th district from 2011 to 2013, won reelection here.

District 11 

The 11th district is based in the East Bay and includes Concord and Richmond. Democrat George Miller, who represented the 7th district from 1975 to 2013, won reelection here.

District 12 

The 12th district is based in the Bay Area and includes most of San Francisco. House Democratic Leader and former Speaker Nancy Pelosi, who represented the 8th district from 1993 to 2013 and previously represented the 5th district from 1987 until 1993, won reelection here.

District 13 

The 13th district is based in the East Bay and includes Berkeley and Oakland. Democrat Barbara Lee, who represented the 9th district from 1998 to 2013, won reelection here.

District 14 

The 14th district is based in the Bay Area and includes most of San Mateo County. Democrat Jackie Speier, who represented the 12th district from 2008 to 2013, won reelection here.

District 15 

The 15th district is based in the East Bay and includes Hayward and Livermore. Democrat Pete Stark, who represented the 13th district from 1993 to 2013 and its predecessors since 1973, lost reelection here to fellow Democrat Eric Swalwell.

District 16 

The 16th district is based in the Central Valley and includes Fresno and Merced. Democrat Jim Costa, who represented the 20th district from 2005 to 2013, won reelection here.

District 17 

The 17th district is based in the Bay Area and includes Sunnyvale, Cupertino, Santa Clara, Fremont, and Milpitas. Democrat Mike Honda, who represented the 15th district from 2001 to 2013, won reelection here.

District 18 

The 18th district is based in the Bay Area and includes Palo Alto, Redwood City, and Saratoga. Democrat Anna Eshoo, who represented the 14th district from 1993 to 2013, won reelection here.

District 19 

The 19th district is based in the South Bay and includes most of San Jose. Democrat Zoe Lofgren, who represented the 16th district from 1995 to 2013, won reelection here.

District 20 

The 20th district is based in the Central Coast and includes Monterey and Santa Cruz. Democrat Sam Farr, who represented the 17th district from 1993 to 2013, won reelection here.

District 21 

The 21st district is based in the Central Valley and includes Hanford and parts of Bakersfield. The district had no incumbent.

District 22 

The 22nd district is based in the Central Valley and includes Clovis, Tulare, and Visalia. Republican Devin Nunes, who represented the 21st district from 2003 to 2013, won reelection here.

District 23 

The 23rd district is based in the southern Central Valley and includes parts of Bakersfield. House Majority Whip and Republican Kevin McCarthy, who represented the 22nd district from 2007 to 2013, won reelection here.

District 24 

The 24th district is based in the Central Coast and includes San Luis Obispo and Santa Barbara. Democrat Lois Capps, who represented California's 23rd congressional district from 2003 to 2013 and the 22nd district from 1998 to 2003, won reelection here.

District 25 

The 25th district is based in northern Los Angeles County and includes Palmdale and Santa Clarita. Republican Howard "Buck" McKeon, who has represented the 25th district since 1993, won reelection here.

District 26 

The 26th district is based in the southern Central Coast and includes Oxnard and Thousand Oaks. Republican Elton Gallegly, who represented the 24th district from 2003 to 2013 and its predecessors since 1987, retired.

District 27 

The 27th district is based in the San Gabriel Foothills and includes Alhambra and Pasadena. Democrat Judy Chu, who represented the 32nd district from 2009 to 2013, won reelection here.

District 28 

The 28th district is based in the northern Los Angeles suburbs and includes Burbank and Glendale as well as parts of central Los Angeles. Democrat Adam Schiff, who represented the 29th district from 2003 to 2013 and the 27th district from 2001 to 2003, won reelection here.

District 29 

The 29th district is based in the northeastern San Fernando Valley. The district had no incumbent.

District 30 

The 30th district is based in the western San Fernando Valley and includes Sherman Oaks. Democrat Brad Sherman, who represented the 27th district from 2003 to 2013 and the 24th district from 1997 to 2003, defeated fellow Democrat Howard Berman, who represented the 28th district from 2003 to 2013 and the 26th district from 1983 to 2003. The campaign was one of the most expensive in the nation.

Open primary

Polling

Results

Endorsements

Results

District 31 

The 31st district is based in the Inland Empire and includes San Bernardino and Rancho Cucamonga. Republicans David Dreier, who represented the 26th district from 2003 to 2013 and its predecessors since 1981, and Jerry Lewis, who represented the 41st district from 2003 to 2013 and its predecessors since 1979, retired. Republican Gary Miller, who represented the 42nd district from 2003 to 2013 and the 41st district from 1999 to 2003, won reelection here.

District 32 

The 32nd district is based in the San Gabriel Valley and includes El Monte and West Covina. Republican David Dreier, who represented the 26th district from 2003 to 2013 and its predecessors since 1978, retired. Democrat Grace Napolitano, who represented the 38th district from 2003 to 2013 and the 34th district from 1999 to 2003, won reelection here.

District 33 

The 33rd district is based in coastal Los Angeles County and includes Beverly Hills and Santa Monica. Democrat Henry Waxman, who represented the 30th district from 2003 to 2013 and the 24th and 29th districts from 1975 to 1993 and 1993 to 2003 respectively, won reelection here.

District 34 

The 34th district is based in central Los Angeles and includes Chinatown and Downtown Los Angeles. Democrat Xavier Becerra, who represented the 31st district from 2003 to 2013 and the 30th district from 1993 to 2003, won reelection here.

District 35 

The 35th district is based in the Inland Empire and includes Fontana, Ontario, and Pomona. Democrat Joe Baca, who represented the 43rd district from 2003 to 2013 and the 42nd district from 1999 to 2003, lost reelection here to fellow Democrat Gloria Negrete McLeod.

District 36 

The 36th district is based in eastern Riverside County and includes Palm Springs. Republican Mary Bono Mack, who represented the 45th district from 2003 to 2013 and the 44th district from 1998 to 2003, lost reelection here to Democrat Raul Ruiz.

District 37 

The 37th district is based in West Los Angeles and includes Crenshaw and Culver City. Democrat Karen Bass, who represented the 33rd district from 2011 to 2013, won reelection here.

District 38 

The 38th district is based in the eastern Los Angeles suburbs and includes Norwalk and Whittier. Democrat Linda Sánchez, who represented the 39th district from 2003 to 2013, won reelection here.

District 39 

The 39th district straddles the Los Angeles–Orange county border and includes Chino Hills, Diamond Bar, and Fullerton. Republican Ed Royce, who represented the 40th district from 2003 to 2013 and the 39th district from 1993 to 2003, won reelection here. Democrat Jay Chen did much better than previous Royce opponents among the Asian American community, earning 62% of the overall Asian American vote, and 95% of the Chinese American vote.

District 40 

The 40th district is based in central Los Angeles County and includes Downey and East Los Angeles. Democrat Lucille Roybal-Allard, who represented the 34th district from 2003 to 2013 and the 33rd district from 1993 to 2003, won reelection here.

District 41 

The 41st district is based in the Inland Empire and includes Moreno Valley, Perris, and Riverside. The district had no incumbent.

District 42 

The 42nd district is based in the Inland Empire and includes Corona and Murrieta. Republican Ken Calvert, who represented the 44th district from 2003 to 2013 and the 43rd district from 1993 to 2003, won reelection here.

District 43 

The 43rd district is based in South Los Angeles and includes Hawthorne and Inglewood. Democrat Maxine Waters, who represented the 35th district from 1993 to 2013 and the 29th district from 1991 to 1993, won reelection here.

District 44 

The 44th district is based in south Los Angeles County and includes Carson, Compton, and San Pedro. Democrat Janice Hahn, who represented the 36th district from 2011 to 2013, defeated fellow Democrat Laura Richardson, who represented the 37th district from 2007 to 2013.

District 45 

The 45th district is based in inland Orange County and includes Irvine and Mission Viejo. Republican John Campbell, who represented the 48th district from 2005 to 2013, won reelection here.

District 46 

The 46th district is based in central Orange County and includes Anaheim and Santa Ana. Democrat Loretta Sanchez, who represented the 47th district from 2003 to 2013 and the 46th district from 1997 to 2003, won reelection here.

District 47 

The 47th district includes Long Beach and parts of Orange County. The district had no incumbent.

District 48 

The 48th district is based in coastal Orange County and includes Huntington Beach. Republican Dana Rohrabacher, who represented the 46th district from 2003 to 2013 and the 42nd and 45th districts from 1989 to 1993 and 1993 to 2003 respectively, won reelection here.

District 49 

The 49th district is based in northern San Diego County and includes Carlsbad and Oceanside. Republican Darrell Issa, who has represented the 49th district since 2003 and the 48th district from 2001 to 2003, won reelection here.

District 50 

The 50th district is based in inland San Diego County and includes Escondido and Santee. Republican Duncan D. Hunter, who represented the 52nd district from 2009 to 2013, won reelection here.

District 51 

The new 51st district runs along the border with Mexico and includes Imperial County and San Diego. Democrat Bob Filner, who represented the 51st district from 2003 to 2013 and the 50th district from 1993 until 2003, retired to run for mayor of San Diego. State Senator Juan Vargas was predicted to face fellow Democratic State Senator Denise Moreno Ducheny in the general election, but he spent some of his funds on mailers to help Republican Michael Crimmins, who he preferred to face in the general election in this heavily Democratic seat. Vargas spent $40–50,000 helping Crimmins, at least eight times more than Crimmins spent himself. The effort was successful as Crimmins finished 2,909 votes ahead of Ducheny. Vargas then won the general election in a landslide.

District 52 

The 52nd district is based in coastal San Diego and includes La Jolla and Poway. Republican Brian Bilbray, who represented the 50th district from 2006 to 2013 and previously served from 1995 until 2001, lost reelection here to Democrat Scott Peters.

District 53 

The 53rd district is based in Central San Diego and includes La Mesa and Lemon Grove. Democrat Susan Davis, who has represented the 53rd district since 2003 and previously represented the 49th district from 2001 to 2003, won reelection here.

Notes

References

External links 
 Elections and Voter Information from the California Secretary of State
 Certified list of candidates for the general election
United States House of Representatives elections in California, 2012 at Ballotpedia
 Campaign contributions at OpenSecrets
 Outside spending at the Sunlight Foundation
 District maps from the California Citizens Redistricting Commission
 Debates:
 District 7 debate on C-SPAN, September 25, 2012
 District 26 debate on C-SPAN, October 2, 2012
 District 36 debate on C-SPAN, October 12, 2012
 District 52 debate on C-SPAN, October 10, 2012

U.S. House of Representatives
California
2012